Vernon Weiss (born 1951) was a key person in the development of the Dell XPS computer line at Dell and was the director of the computer line at Packard Bell. The XPS line is considered the start of the Gaming Desktop Computer Industry. 

During his early years in the computer industry, Vernon Weiss was also involved with the Data General One, Two and the Data General Walkabout.

References
 http://www.cyperus.com/cgi-bin/stories.pl?ACCT=104&STORY=/www/story/8-4-97/290667&EDATE=
 http://www.digibarn.com/collections/systems/dg-1/index.html

1951 births
Living people
Date of birth missing (living people)